The Verata is a traditional Spanish breed of domestic goat. It is a dual-purpose breed, reared both for its meat and for its milk. It is named for, and is thought to originate in, the comarca of La Vera, in the province of Cáceres, in the northern part of the autonomous community of Extremadura in western central Spain. It is one of two traditional goat breeds in Extremadura, the other being the Retinta Extremeña.

History 

The Verata is a traditional and heterogeneous goat breed from the Tagus depression in western central Spain, bounded to the south by the Montes de Toledo and to the north by the western Sistema Central. It was traditionally reared in the Sierra de Gredos, in the area where the provinces of Ávila, Cáceres and Toledo meet. Towards the end of the twentieth century there was some displacement of the breed from its area of origin, the comarca of La Vera, into the comarca of Navalmoral de la Mata to the south.

Characteristics 

The Verata has been known to be fairly easy to handle; they are popular in the dairy and meat industries because of that and they can adapt well to the different management systems. They have been known to be very hardy, and can survive in many climates. They are adapted to the mountain pastures because they have strong, long legs, and they can also survive on poor and scarce feed. 

The Verata Goat is smaller than the average goat, and found in their homes in the Vera in the Caceres region of Spain. They are especially valued for their milk there. Their milk is used in cheese production. Currently, about 17000  Verata Goats inhabit Spain. Generally, these goats are found in herds of 100 to 150 goats.  When grazing is scarce, these goats do well on concentrated feed in confinement, as well.

When they are mature, these goats generally reach a height around 70 cm, and weigh an average of 70 kg; the does are a bit shorter and lighter than the males. These goats have glossy, short hair in either black or brown. They usually have a black facial fringe, a black underbelly, and a black dorsal ridge. They have horns that go outward, and spiral forward, and well-sprung ribs. They have an erect tail; beards are prominent on the males, and about 40% of the females also have prominent beards. They also have dark, hard hooves. The legs of these goats look rather small; thus, the joints look significantly larger.

Use 

Verata Goats are able to breed year round, but breeders and farmers usually breed them in October and November and again in the spring, sometime around March. They have a high fertility rate, and under good conditions, they can have an average of three births every two years. Lactation periods usually last around 175 days, and they yield around 150 L of milk. Kids that have reached around 45 days old can be slaughtered for their meat.

References

Goat breeds
Meat goat breeds
Dairy goat breeds
Goat breeds originating in Spain